The Terminals were a New Zealand alternative rock band. They released material on the Xpressway and Flying Nun labels.

History
The band was formed in 1988, with several members being veterans of other bands. Vocalist Stephen Cogle and drummer Peter Stapleton had both been members of The Victor Dimisich Band in the early 1980s, Stapleton also playing with The Pin Group and Scorched Earth Policy. Guitarist Ross Humphries was an ex-member of The Pin Group, and Mick Elborado played bass and keyboards with Scorched Earth Policy. Signing to Flying Nun, the band's debut release was the Disconnect EP in 1988, followed by two albums for the label. Humphries was replaced by former Scorched Earth Policy guitarist Brian Crook. The band moved to the Xpressway label for their third album, Touch. Little Things followed in 1995.

Drummer and lyricist Peter Stapleton died in 2020.

Band members

Original line-up
 Stephen Cogle (guitar/vocals)
 Ross Humphries (guitar/vocals)
 Susan Heney (bass)
 Mick Elborado (organ)
 Peter Stapleton (drums)

Middle line-up
 Stephen Cogle (guitar/vocals)
 Brian Crook (guitar/vocals)
 John Chrisstoffels (bass)
 Mick Elborado (organ)
 Peter Stapleton (drums)

Last line-up
 Stephen Cogle (guitar/vocals)
 Nicole Moffat (violin/vocals)
 John Chrisstoffels (bass)
 Mick Elborado (organ)
 Peter Stapleton (drums)

Discography

Featured appearances
The group have appeared on a few compilations since their inception in New Zealand and Australia.  The following is a list of these albums that have featured tracks by The Terminals.

 (1992) – What's That Noise (xpressway)

Singles

References

External links
Interview with The Terminals
The Terminals entry at Trouser Press

Flying Nun Records artists
New Zealand indie rock groups